Damien Furtado (born 8 March 1997) is a French footballer who plays for the B-team of Rio Ave F.C. as a winger.

Football career
On 5 August 2018, Furtado made his professional debut with Rio Ave in a 2018–19 Taça da Liga match against Portimonense.

Personal life
Furtado was born in France to a Cape Verdean father and Angolan mother.

References

External links

1997 births
Living people
Footballers from Essonne
French footballers
French sportspeople of Cape Verdean descent
French people of Angolan descent
French expatriate footballers
Association football forwards
Primeira Liga players
Segunda Divisão players
Rio Ave F.C. players
F.C. Famalicão players
Casa Pia A.C. players
French expatriate sportspeople in Portugal
Expatriate footballers in Portugal